This is a list of VTV dramas released in 2008.

←2007 - 2008 - 2009→

VTV Tet dramas
These short dramas air on VTV channels during Tet holiday.

VTV1

VTV3

VTV1 Weeknight Prime-time dramas
These dramas air from 20:10 to 21:00, Monday to Friday on VTV1.
Note: From 21 August to 14 November, the time slot  was spit in two with Bỗng dưng muốn khóc aired on Monday to Wednesday & Nhà có nhiều cửa sổ aired on Thursday and Friday.

VTV3 Weeknight Prime-time dramas
Starting on 2008, VTV opened new prime time slot for Vietnamese dramas on VTV3 channel.

Monday-Wednesday dramas
These dramas air from 21h to 21h50, Monday to Wednesday on VTV3.

Thursday-Friday dramas
These dramas air from 21h to 21h50, Thursday and Friday on VTV3.

VTV3 Cinema For Saturday Afternoon dramas
These dramas air in early Saturday afternoon on VTV3 with the duration approximately 70 minutes as a part of the program Cinema for Saturday afternoon (Vietnamese: Điện ảnh chiều thứ Bảy).

VTV3 Sunday Literature & Art dramas
These dramas air in early Sunday afternoon on VTV3 as a part of the program Sunday Literature & Art (Vietnamese: Văn nghệ Chủ Nhật).

See also
 List of dramas broadcast by Vietnam Television (VTV)
 List of dramas broadcast by Hanoi Radio Television (HanoiTV)
 List of dramas broadcast by Vietnam Digital Television (VTC)

References

External links
VTV.gov.vn – Official VTV Website 
VTV.vn – Official VTV Online Newspaper 

Vietnam Television original programming
2008 in Vietnamese television